In abstract algebra, a representation of a Hopf algebra is a representation of its underlying associative algebra. That is, a representation of a Hopf algebra H over a field K is a K-vector space V with an action H × V → V usually denoted by juxtaposition ( that is, the image of (h,v) is written hv ). The vector space V is called an H-module.

Properties
The module structure of a representation of a Hopf algebra H is simply its structure as a module for the underlying associative algebra. The main use of considering the additional structure of a Hopf algebra is when considering all H-modules as a category. The additional structure is also used to define invariant elements of an H-module V. An element v in V is invariant under H if for all h in H, hv = ε(h)v, where ε is the counit of H. The subset of all invariant elements of V forms a submodule of V.

Categories of representations as a motivation for Hopf algebras
For an associative algebra H, the tensor product V1 ⊗ V2 of two H-modules V1 and V2 is a vector space, but not necessarily an H-module. For the tensor product to be a functorial product operation on H-modules, there must be a linear binary operation Δ : H → H ⊗ H such that for any v in V1 ⊗ V2 and any h in H,

and for any v in V1 ⊗ V2 and a and b in H,

using sumless Sweedler's notation, which is somewhat like an index free form of Einstein's summation convention. This is satisfied if there is a Δ such that Δ(ab) = Δ(a)Δ(b) for all a, b in H.

For the category of H-modules to be a strict monoidal category with respect to ⊗,  and  must be equivalent and there must be unit object εH, called the trivial module, such that εH ⊗ V, V and V ⊗ εH are equivalent. 

This means that for any v in 

 

and for h in H,

This will hold for any three H-modules if Δ satisfies 

The trivial module must be one-dimensional, and so an algebra homomorphism ε : H → F may be defined such that hv = ε(h)v for all v in εH. The trivial module may be identified with F, with 1 being the element such that 1 ⊗ v = v = v ⊗ 1 for all v. It follows that for any v in any H-module V, any c in εH and any h in H,

The existence of an algebra homomorphism ε satisfying 

 

is a sufficient condition for the existence of the trivial module. 

It follows that in order for the category of H-modules to be a monoidal category with respect to the tensor product, it is sufficient for H to have maps Δ and ε satisfying these conditions. This is the motivation for the definition of a bialgebra, where Δ is called the comultiplication and ε is called the counit.

In order for each H-module V to have a dual representation V such that the underlying vector spaces are dual and the operation * is functorial over the monoidal category of H-modules, there must be a linear map S : H → H such that for any h in H, x in V and y in V*,

where  is the usual pairing of dual vector spaces. If the map  induced by the pairing is to be an H-homomorphism, then for any h in H, x in V and y in V*,

which is satisfied if 

 

for all h in H.

If there is such a map S, then it is called an antipode, and H is a Hopf algebra. The desire for a monoidal category of modules with functorial tensor products and dual representations is therefore one motivation for the concept of a Hopf algebra.

Representations on an algebra
A Hopf algebra also has representations which carry additional structure, namely they are algebras.

Let H be a Hopf algebra.  If A is an algebra with the product operation μ : A ⊗ A → A, and ρ : H ⊗ A → A is a representation of H on A, then ρ is said to be a representation of H on an algebra if μ is H-equivariant. As special cases, Lie algebras, Lie superalgebras and groups can also have representations on an algebra.

See also
Tannaka–Krein reconstruction theorem

Hopf algebras
Representation theory